The Japan Cooperative Party (Nihon Kyōdōtō) was a political party in Japan.

History
On 18 December 1945, the party was established by the center of the former Sangyō Kumiai such as cooperatist  and dairy farmer . It initially had around 20 members, and journalist  was assumed chairperson of the party. On 4 January 1946, the Supreme Commander for the Allied Powers (SCAP) published a memorandum pertaining to the Purge (from public office) based on the Potsdam Declaration and an order from the State-War-Navy Coordinating Committee (SWNCC). Only two of the party's 23 legislative members were able to escape the Purge. It won 14 seats in the April 1946 elections. On the other hand, the dominant Liberal Party could not win an absolute majority, so the Shidehara Cabinet did not resign and began maneuvering to cling to power. In response, the party supported a movement for the campaign to oust the cabinet advocated by the Socialist Party, and formed a four-party joint committee of the Japan Cooperative Party, the Socialist Party, the Liberal Party, and the Communist Party. The four-party joint committee started negotiations for a coalition government after defeating the cabinet, but the idea eventually failed due to disagreements within the subcommittee. In May, it merged with several smaller parties to form the Cooperative Democratic Club, later renamed the Cooperative Democratic Party.

Policies
After World War II, several new parties emerged in pursuit of co-operatism as a modification of capitalism, the Japan Cooperative Party was its origin. The party advocated cooperative socialism, co-operatism and Kōtō Goji in its platform. In its policy outline, it described co-operatism as "stabilize the lives of the people through mutual aid between cities and farming / fishing villages centred on cooperatives, and establish and encourage a production system that integrates agriculture, manufacturing and commerce." In addition, it advocated defeat the monopoly capital and every feudalistic element, and aimed at centrism (i.e. stand between capitalism and socialism). The party's mainly base was urban manufacturers and merchants, landlords, wealthy peasants, and small- to medium-sized manufacturers and merchants.

Election results

House of Representatives

References

Further reading

Cooperative parties
Defunct political parties in Japan
Political parties established in 1945
1945 establishments in Japan
Political parties disestablished in 1946
1946 disestablishments in Japan